Warren Township is a township in Lucas County, Iowa, USA.

History
Warren Township was established in 1852.

References

Townships in Lucas County, Iowa
Townships in Iowa
1852 establishments in Iowa
Populated places established in 1852